Mohammad-Reza Rahchamani (‎; 1 December 1952 – 9 March 2020) was an Iranian physician and reformist politician. From 1984 to 2000, he represented Sabzevar in the Iranian Parliament. During the early 2000s, he headed Iran's State Welfare Organization.

Early life and education 
Rahchamani was born in 1952 in Sabzevar and studied medicine. There is no record of imprisonment for him before the Iranian Revolution, and he is not an Iran–Iraq War veteran.

Career 
A founding member of the Islamic Iran Solidarity Party, from 1998 to 2002 he was the party's secretary-general and in 2006 became chairman of the central council. He was also a founding member of the Islamic Association of Iranian Medical Society.

In 2020, as the secretary-general of the National Unity and Cooperation Party, he defied the decision of mainstream reformists for not taking part in the 2020 Iranian legislative election, by announcing a coalition of twelve reformist parties.

Death
Rahchamani died at the age of 67 due to complications from COVID-19 on 9 March 2020.

References

1952 births
2020 deaths
People from Sabzevar
Islamic Iran Solidarity Party politicians
Islamic Association of Iranian Medical Society politicians
Members of the 2nd Islamic Consultative Assembly
Members of the 3rd Islamic Consultative Assembly
Members of the 4th Islamic Consultative Assembly
Members of the 5th Islamic Consultative Assembly
Deaths from the COVID-19 pandemic in Iran